Rambantu is a 1996 Telugu-language drama film produced by M. Chitti Babu and G. Gnaram Harish under the Vijaya Chamundeswari Movies banner, presented by Rajendra Prasad and directed by Bapu. It stars Rajendra Prasad and  Eswari Rao, with music composed by M. M. Keeravani. The film was recorded as a super hit at the box office.

Plot
The film begins on Rambantu a tribal boy, whose father dies while guarding Zamindar Raja Ramachandra Prasad (Satyanarayana) against harm in hunting. So he bestows his gratitude by rearing Rambantu along with his children. Zamindar leads a happy family life with wife Indrani (Y. Vijaya) and 4 children. But Indrani being a shrew looks down Rambantu and pesters her step-daughter Kaveri. Years roll by, Rambantu (Rajendra Prasad) becomes a trustworthy servant of Zamindar, though he is illiterate has a divine talent of naturopathy to cure diseases. Meanwhile, Gireesam (Kota Srinivasa Rao) a swindler, fraudulently cracks into the Zamindar's house who entices them, takes charge of his wealth and even puts a bad eye on Kaveri (Eswari Rao). So, he ploys, by affirming her horoscope as deleterious to her spouse who will soon die after the marriage. Thereupon, everyone rebukes her when she attempts suicide. Rambantu saves and ties a wedding chain Mangalasutram to remove her curse. Here, Gireesam exploits, by denouncing Rambantu's deed when Zamindar knocks and necks him out along with Kaveri. Right now, Rambantu moves to the city where he startups a small scale business and becomes a millionaire with his talent. Now, Kaveri tries to match with Rambantu which he denies, as he still believes that the curse becomes true afterward, Kaveri will be paired with a wise person. Parallelly, at the palace, Gireesam bankrupts Zamindar. At last, Rambantu safeguards his master and ceases Gireesam when they learn that Kaveri's horoscope as falsity. Finally, Zamindar declares Rambantu as his son-in-law and couples him with Kaveri.

Cast
Rajendra Prasad as Rambantu
Eswari Rao as Kaveri
Satyanarayana as Raja Ramachandra Prasad / Doragaru
Kota Srinivasa Rao as Girisam
A.V.S. as Ambiraju
Gundu Sudarshan as Japan
Rajeev Kanakala as Jayakrishna
Jakki as Raana
Jyoti Reddy
Krishna Sri as Jayasri
Y. Vijaya as Rani Indrani
 Baby Aishwarya in the song "Emo Gurram Egaravachu"

Soundtrack

Music composed by M. M. Keeravani. Lyrics written by Veturi. Music released on ADITYA Music Company.

Awards
 Master Uday won Nandi Award for Best Child Actor of this film.

Other
 VCDs and DVDs on - SHALIMAR Video Company, Hyderabad

References

External links
 

1996 films
1990s Telugu-language films
Films directed by Bapu
Films scored by M. M. Keeravani